Australia's Country Way is an Australian road route from Rockhampton to Wallangarra in Queensland and then to Sydney, New South Wales. Using Australia's Country Way, it is 1615 km from Rockhampton to Sydney, requiring approx 20 hours of driving. It has been designated by the Queensland Government as a State Strategic Touring Route.

The route 
The route is:
 Rockhampton via the Burnett Highway to Monto
 Monto via the Burnett Highway to Wondai and then via the Bunya Highway to Kingaroy
 Kingaroy via the D'Aguilar Highway to Yarraman and then via the New England Highway to Toowoomba
 Toowoomba via the New England Highway to Warwick
 Warwick via the New England Highway to Wallangarra and then to Tenterfield, New South Wales
 Tenterfield via the New England Highway to Armidale
 Armidale via the New England Highway to Tamworth
 Tamworth via the New England Highway to Newcastle and then via the M1 Pacific Motorway to Sydney

References 

State Strategic Touring Routes in Queensland
Roads in New South Wales